"Million Dollar Loan" is a song by American indie rock band Death Cab for Cutie. It was released on October 10, 2016 as the first song in the Dave Eggers-headed project 30 Days, 30 Songs. Like the other songs in the project, the song lyrically takes aim at Donald Trump, the Republican nominee for president in the country's 2016 election. The project aimed to release one song every day from October 10 until Election Day, all of which are, according to its website, "written and recorded by musicians for a Trump-free America." It is the band's first new song since the 2015 album Kintsugi.

Composition
In a statement, Death Cab for Cutie's singer and songwriter Ben Gibbard explained why he wrote the song:

Music video
A music video was also made for the song to coincide with its release, in which a wall is gradually built around Trump. The video was directed by Kyle Cogan of Simian Design.

References

2016 singles
2016 songs
2016 United States presidential election in popular culture
Atlantic Records singles
Death Cab for Cutie songs
Protest songs
Songs about Donald Trump
Songs written by Ben Gibbard
Criticism of Donald Trump